The 2011 IZOD IndyCar World Championship was the scheduled final race of the 2011 IZOD IndyCar series. It was to be run at Las Vegas Motor Speedway in Las Vegas, Nevada USA on October 16, 2011, and was scheduled for 200 laps around the facility's 1.544 mile oval. 

The race, however, was cancelled after twelve laps had been run. Contact between drivers Wade Cunningham and James Hinchcliffe triggered a massive chain reaction crash that involved fifteen of the thirty-three entrants in the event and resulted in the death of former IndyCar Series champion Dan Wheldon. Open wheel racing has not returned to the circuit since the incident.

Report

Background
The Las Vegas race was added to the schedule for the 2011 season, replacing the event at Homestead-Miami Speedway as the final race of the IndyCar season. The races at Homestead and the International Speedway Corporation tracks were removed from the schedule following the previous year's season. Las Vegas Motor Speedway was returning to the IndyCar schedule for the first time since 2000, and the event marked the first open-wheel race at the circuit since the Hurricane Relief 400 Champ Car event in 2005. The circuit since was reconfigured in 2006, which saw a greater degree of banking added to the circuit to encourage side-by-side racing. The race was scheduled for 200 laps around the  oval, totaling .

This was the final entry for Vítor Meira, Paul Tracy, Tomas Scheckter, Buddy Rice, and Davey Hamilton, and Dan Wheldon.

This would also be the final entry for Danica Patrick until 2018, where she would participate in the Indy 500 to conclude her racing career.

Media coverage
ABC broadcast the race on American television. Marty Reid was the lead commentator with Scott Goodyear and Eddie Cheever as analysts. Vince Welch, Jamie Little, and Rick DeBruhl were the pit reporters.

The IMS Radio Network provided the radio coverage with Mike King on lead. Josef Newgarden, who had run the Indy Lights series event earlier in the day and had been crowned that series’ champion for 2011, was the booth analyst; Davey Hamilton, who normally occupied that role, entered the event in a car fielded by Dreyer & Reinbold Racing. Mark Jaynes reported from Turn 3, and Jake Query and Kevin Lee served as the pit reporters.

The $5 Million Challenge
On May 3, 2011, IndyCar CEO Randy Bernard announced that a $5,000,000 (USD) purse would be awarded to any driver not on the IndyCar circuit to enter the race at Las Vegas and win while starting from the back of the field. Bernard's original offer was exclusively to "any race car driver in the world outside of the IZOD IndyCar Series," hoping to attract interest from Formula 1 or NASCAR. Bernard received offers that he deemed viable from motocross racer Travis Pastrana, former IndyCar champion Alex Zanardi, and NASCAR's Kasey Kahne, but all three offers were not without issue. 

Pastrana, who also drove rally cars and would eventually compete in NASCAR, had entered the Best Trick event at X Games XVII in Los Angeles in July 2011. During his attempt at a rodeo 720, Pastrana crashed on landing and broke his foot and ankle. He was still working to rehabilitate the injury, and would likely have required special controls to be put in the car if he was to attempt the feat. 

Zanardi’s problem was twofold. He had not competed in an IndyCar event since the 2001 American Memorial at EuroSpeedway Lausitz, during which both of his legs were severed on impact after Alex Tagliani hit his car after Zanardi, who had been exiting out road, lost control of his vehicle. Zanardi also requested to drive for his former team, Chip Ganassi Racing, and they were unable to fulfill his request due to a lack of available resources. Kahne also had this problem, as he desired to drive for Team Penske. In his case, cross-country travel would cause a logistical issue; NASCAR would be running the Bank of America 500 at Lowe’s Motor Speedway the night before IndyCar’s event. 

Bernard later revised the challenge to include a driver who had only competed in IndyCar part-time during the 2011 season; the challenge was accepted by 2011 Indianapolis 500 winner Dan Wheldon, who had run only one additional race that season: the Kentucky Indy 300, in which Wheldon also started at the back of the field in the No. 77 Sam Schmidt car, and finished 14th. Wheldon agreed to split the purse with a fan if he went on to win.

Championship battle
Entering the race, the only two drivers still in contention for the IndyCar Championship were Ganassi's Franchitti and Penske's Power. Franchitti was 18 points ahead of Power, retaking the championship points lead from him with a second-place finish at the 2011 Kentucky Indy 300 two weeks prior. Power was still mathematically in the points race despite an awful finish at Kentucky, but needed to finish far ahead of Franchitti in order to win the championship title.

The race's honorary grand marshal was skateboarder Tony Hawk, who gave the command to start the engines.

Qualifying

A total of thirty-four cars qualified for the race. Tony Kanaan, driving the  82 Dallara for KV Racing Technology, qualified on the pole for the race and shared the front row with Oriol Servià, driving the No. 2 Dallara for Newman/Haas Racing. Danica Patrick, driving the No. 7 Dallara for Andretti Autosport, started 9th in what was her final IndyCar start before joining NASCAR. The two remaining championship contenders qualified on row 9, with Power 17th in the No. 12 Dallara and Franchitti 18th in the No. 10 Dallara. In addition to Wheldon's No. 77 Dallara, which he piloted for Sam Schmidt Motorsports, Buddy Rice was forced to start from the rear of the field when he received a penalty in qualifying for driving the No. 44 Dallara below the track's white line.

Lap 11 crash – Death of Dan Wheldon

The accident began on the front straightaway as the field headed into turn one. Wade Cunningham, Wheldon's teammate in No. 17, clipped James Hinchcliffe, driving No. 06, and then made contact with J. R. Hildebrand in No. 4. Then Cunningham swerved and Hildebrand drove over the rear of his car, causing his to go airborne. Cunningham collected Jay Howard in No. 15 on the inside and then Townsend Bell in No. 22 on the outside before colliding with the retaining wall. Attempting to avoid the crash ahead, Vítor Meira lost control of his No. 14 and spun inward, collecting both Charlie Kimball's No. 83 and E. J. Viso's No. 59. Tomas Scheckter, in No. 57, was also attempting to avoid the crash by rapidly slowing down on the outside. Following that, Paul Tracy ran into the back of his car with his No. 8 and Pippa Mann, rapidly approaching in No. 30, went over the top of him after jerking to the outside to avoid crashing into Alex Lloyd in No. 19.

As cars continued to drive through the accident scene, the No. 77 car driven by Wheldon and the No. 12 driven by Power left the racing surface. Wheldon was racing at  when he came upon the scene, frantically trying to avoid the collision. Although he was able to considerably slow it down, Wheldon's car went airborne about  after running into the back of Kimball's and went barrel-rolling into the catch fence cockpit-first, causing his head to hit one of the poles. The No. 77 landed back on the racing surface having been sliced apart by the fence and slid to a stop next to the SAFER barrier. Meanwhile, Power went airborne when he ran over the back of Lloyd's car and struck the SAFER barrier. The car landed sideways on the track and rolled over, which caused the front wheel assembly to break; one of the front tires flew over Power's head and barely missed hitting him.

A total of 15 cars were involved, with the most severe injuries suffered by Wheldon, Power, Hildebrand, and Mann. Wheldon was extricated from his car and was airlifted to the University Medical Center of Southern Nevada. He was officially pronounced dead on arrival two hours later at 1:54 PM Pacific Daylight Time. The official cause of Wheldon's death was given by the Clark County Coroner as blunt force trauma to his head due to the incident. Mann and Hildebrand were later taken to the hospital for overnight observation, while Power was evaluated and released that day.

IndyCar officials stopped the proceedings one lap later and put the race under a red flag. The nineteen cars that were still running were called to their pit boxes, and work began on the cleanup. The damage caused by the crash was significant. The catch fence had been damaged where the #77 had made contact with it and would need to be repaired before racing resumed. In addition, as some of the drivers drove through the scene during the brief caution period, they reported massive amounts of debris that they could not avoid driving over and that the asphalt surface had received several gashes in it that would need to be patched. With all of the work that needed to be done, there would be a significant delay in resuming the race. The only thing left to be determined would be to see who would win the race. Power's involvement in the incident had resulted in Franchitti clinching the points championship, and since no other driver had taken the $5,000,000 challenge, there would be no prize awarded. 

Still, IndyCar officials elected to keep the race under red flag conditions as they worked on a solution. The delay extended for nearly three hours, and tension began to mount over both the status of the race and the condition of Wheldon, as there had been no updates since the accident. During the lengthy delay, ESPN conducted interviews with several drivers, who expressed their growing concern for their fellow competitor, as well as team owner Michael Andretti, who took it upon himself to head to the trailer on pit road where the officials were located. He would be turned away by the officials and return with no further information.

At approximately 3:00 pm PST, IndyCar Series director Brian Barnhart called for all race team personnel to report to the infield media center for a meeting that was closed to reporters. The ABC broadcast was able to capture video of the drivers and team personnel as they exited the media center, and their expressions as they left were grim. Tony Kanaan, the race polesitter and a former teammate of Wheldon's from their days driving for Andretti's race team, was shown sobbing as he returned to his pit box.

As the meeting ended, Randy Bernard called a press conference. There, he gave a brief statement where he informed the media that Wheldon had died of his injuries suffered in the accident. He then announced that the remainder of the race was cancelled and that the drivers would be returning to the track for what he referred to as a "five lap salute" to honor their fallen competitor, then left without taking any questions. ABC cut into the press conference late and missed Bernard’s initial statement, which left Marty Reid to break the news to the viewing audience.

Meanwhile, the scoring tower was blanked except for the number 77, which was displayed in the first place position. With Kanaan, Ed Carpenter, and Ryan Briscoe leading, eighteen of the nineteen cars that were still running when the accident happened lined up on pit road in six rows of three, akin to the starting formation for the Indianapolis 500. The only car that did not take part in the salute was Bryan Herta Autosport's car, which Wheldon drove to victory at Indianapolis earlier in 2011 but was driven that day by Alex Tagliani.

The safety car then led the cars back onto the track while every crew member and person behind the wall moved to the grass separating pit road from the track to watch. The track loudspeakers blared renditions of "Danny Boy" and "Amazing Grace" played on bagpipes while the cars went around the track at pace lap speed, and each time the cars passed the start/finish line the fans remaining in the front-stretch grandstand offered applause. At the end of the five tribute laps, the starter waved two checkered flags to signify the end while the cars proceeded around the track one more time before exiting for the pits in turn four.

Wheldon's death was the first suffered by an IndyCar driver since Paul Dana was killed in a race-morning practice crash at Homestead-Miami in 2006.

Championship resolution
As noted above, the accident on lap 11 ended the championship points battle and would have clinched the season championship for Franchitti regardless of the results of the race. Since the event did not reach IndyCar standards for an official race, meaning it did not pass the halfway mark before it was abandoned, none of the drivers involved were awarded points and the driver point totals entering the race stood as the final totals for the season.

This was Franchitti's third consecutive and fourth overall championship, and fourth consecutive championship for Chip Ganassi Racing (equaling a feat achieved in CART from 1996 to 1999). Indy Racing League, LLC. delayed all official prize-giving, choosing instead to conduct it during the annual State of IndyCar speech in February 2012; Franchitti also delayed his own celebration of his championship victory.

Reactions

At the time of his death, Wheldon had been working with IndyCar officials to develop the ICONIC chassis with the intention of improving safety in the sport. Planned changes to the chassis include larger cockpits for driver protection and bodywork over the rear wheels to prevent cars from launching off one another in the event of a collision, long a problem in open-wheel racing, regardless of oval or road course, but troublesome on high-speed ovals and tight street circuits with a long straight and a tight turn, similar to the style of many modern road courses.

Prominent figures within the IndyCar fraternity and the wider international motorsport community expressed their condolences to Wheldon and his family. Wheldon had been scheduled to take part in the Gold Coast 600, a round of the V8 Supercars championship, on October 22, racing alongside his friend James Courtney. Upon hearing of Wheldon's death, Courtney described the accident as a sobering reminder of the dangers faced by racing drivers. As the first major international motorsport event after Wheldon's death, organizers of the V8 Supercars series planned a series of tributes to him at the Gold Coast 600. Wheldon's place was taken by another British driver, Darren Turner, an FIA GT1 World Championship competitor. Wheldon's name was left on the car as a mark of respect, while British drivers at the event paid tribute to him with helmet decals, and several other drivers planned individual tributes to Wheldon. Kanaan, who had also been scheduled to race in Australia, announced his withdrawal from the event out of respect for Wheldon. However, Briscoe, Tagliani, and Hélio Castroneves, all of whom raced at Las Vegas, along with other part-time IndyCar drivers Sébastien Bourdais and Simon Pagenaud, who were not at Las Vegas, did race. Bourdais, the best performing "International" driver, received the Dan Wheldon Memorial Trophy. Sam Schmidt, for whom Wheldon had been racing at the time of his accident, admitted that the events at Las Vegas Motor Speedway had prompted him to re-evaluate his involvement in motorsports. Similarly, veteran drivers Davey Hamilton and Paul Tracy said they were considering retiring from racing on the back of the accident.

In the NASCAR Sprint Cup Series, several drivers at the 2011 Good Sam Club 500 at Talladega on the weekend after Wheldon's death put special tributes on their cars, like NASCAR issuing the "Lionheart Knight" decal Wheldon wore on his helmet, which were placed on the cars' b-pillars, along with T. J. Bell putting Wheldon's name on the namerail.

Driver Marco Andretti withdrew from The Celebrity Apprentice, which started taping days after the incident, and was replaced by his father Michael, team principal of Andretti Autosport.

On December 9, 2011, IndyCar decided that they were not going to return to Las Vegas for the 2012 season. Randy Bernard expressed reluctance to return to the speedway following Wheldon's death, despite the insistence of Speedway Motorsports, Inc. president Bruton Smith (who owns the track in Las Vegas as well as three other tracks used by the IndyCar series) for the series to honor its three-year contract with the track. As of that date, the investigation into the accident was still ongoing. IndyCar was holding back on the release of its 2012 schedule until the investigation concluded.  The IndyCar series also conducted an investigation into whether or not the series should continue racing on high-banked ovals such as Las Vegas and Texas Motor Speedway in Denton, Texas. Texas had been one of the staples of the IndyCar series since 1997 and had yet to be confirmed for 2012 prior to the Las Vegas race in 2011. Indycar's future at high-banked ovals was in jeopardy pending the results of the investigation. Texas was eventually placed on the 2012 schedule.

The series went to new restrictions on restarts. IndyCar announced that restarts would only be single-file in 2012, rather than double-file as they had been the previous season.

Criticism

In the build-up to the event, several drivers expressed unease at the race – with Franchitti, Oriol Servià and Alex Lloyd the most vocal opponents – particularly given the high degree of banking around the circuit, with between 18 and 20 degrees of banking in the corners. Franchitti was quoted as saying that the track was "not suitable" for IndyCar racing, while championship rival Will Power described the race as "an accident waiting to happen".

The field of 34 drivers was the biggest in an IndyCar series race since the 1997 Indianapolis 500. A typical oval track race has six to eight fewer drivers, except for the Indianapolis 500, which normally has a 33-car field (but is run at the Indianapolis Motor Speedway, which is two and a half miles in distance with a maximum banking of 9.2 degrees, as opposed to Las Vegas which is one and a half miles in distance and has banking up to 20 degrees). ESPN.com senior motorsports writer Terry Blount wrote: "Obviously more cars presents more danger. They wanted a whole lot of cars cause obviously this is their season finale and they wanted it to be a big deal. Some of the people that were driving in this event yesterday had no business being in it. Some of them had never driven on a track like this. That was a mistake". Chris Powell, president of Las Vegas Motor Speedway, defended the race, saying that the circuit had passed all of the IndyCar Series' accreditation procedures and was deemed suitable for racing. He also went on the record to say that despite the media reporting the concerns of several drivers over the safety of the event, none of those concerns had been raised with him.

They all bunch up together so there are thirty-four cars in a small space of track. One person makes a mistake and this happens. You [shouldn't] have to get killed if you make a mistake. It was madness." Former Formula One and IndyCar driver Mark Blundell agreed, claiming that the Las Vegas circuit was unsuitable for IndyCar racing – this was the last race for the Dallara IR05 – while NASCAR Sprint Cup Series champion Jimmie Johnson called for the series to leave oval racing altogether, though he clarified his statement by saying that the open-wheel type cars on a resurfaced  track built for the heavier Sprint Cup and Nationwide Series cars was a bad idea (the circuit was reconfigured from 12 degrees to the 18-20 degree banking in 2006;  ten years later, Johnson took the Rookie Orientation Program for the 2022 Indianapolis 500. However, former champion Mario Andretti said that the accident was a "freakish" one-off incident and that facilities at the circuit were adequate for racing. While he admitted surprise that more drivers were not seriously injured, he also cautioned against what he called "knee-jerk reactions" to the accident, calling for any changes to the sport to be carefully considered before being introduced, rather than being rushed into action. Former Fédération Internationale de l'Automobile (FIA) President Max Mosley, a long-time advocate of increased safety in motorsport, agreed with Andretti, urging a "calm and scientific" approach to any proposed changes, particularly when asked about the proposed introduction of closed canopies for open-wheel racing cars.

The five million dollar prize was also the subject of criticism in that a driver inexperienced in driving IndyCars would have a higher risk of causing a crash, though Formula One driver Anthony Davidson downplayed the influence of the prize in causing the accident, stating that racing drivers by their nature try to win every race, whether they start from first or last.

In the days following the incident, it was learned that at least three additional drivers had been approached to try for the $5 million challenge prize. One was Scott Speed, who previously ran open-wheel Formula One cars for Scuderia Toro Rosso and who had raced on the reconfigured LVMS track in the Craftsman Truck Series for Morgan-Dollar Motorsports in 2008 and for Team Red Bull in the NASCAR Sprint Cup Series in 2009 and 2010. Speed, in an interview he gave to Inside Edition on October 18, 2011, said that he declined to take the offer saying that the track conditions were too dangerous for Indy-type cars. Likewise, A. J. Allmendinger, who also had previous open-wheel experience, had expressed early interest, though he later declined, recalling, "[When] we raced CART at Vegas...it scared the living hell out of me." Finnish media reported that  Formula One World Champion Kimi Räikkönen, who was splitting time between the World Rally Championship and NASCAR in 2011, had also been approached to take part in the race, but Räikkönen rejected the offer as he was not confident of having a competitive car, rather than having concerns over safety.

Investigation

Three days after the accident, series organizers announced that the race would be the subject of a full investigation. The other members of the Automobile Competition Committee for the United States (ACCUS), the national governing body of automobile racing in the United States, and a member of the FIA made their resources available for the investigation, which IndyCar officials expected to take several weeks. As all ACCUS/FIA members participated in the investigation, IndyCar would have full use of the NASCAR R&D Center in Concord, North Carolina. In the meantime, all testing at Las Vegas Motor Speedway was cancelled indefinitely; Franchitti and Chip Ganassi Racing had been planning to test the 2012-spec Dallara chassis at the circuit in the week following the race.

Results
The results of the investigation into Wheldon's death were released on December 15, 2011. In a report prepared by crash investigators, it was found that Wheldon's death was caused by an impact with the catch fencing around the circuit. Brian Barnhart further rejected claims that the banking had also contributed to the accident, stating that it created two ideal racing lines, and that these lines made the location of cars more predictable for other drivers; at the time of the accident, all 34 cars had been behaving as expected. The report also revealed that the right front pull rod of the suspension assembly penetrated Wheldon's survival cell, though it did not cause him any injury. The report recommended further investigation of this phenomenon, as it was the first recorded incident of its kind in nine years of the use of the IR03 and later IR05 model chassis, which was being retired at the end of the race. The pull-rod suspension chassis is not being utilised in the DW12, however, a similar penetration in a DW12 would later cause significant injury to James Hinchcliffe during practice for the 2015 Indianapolis 500.

Legacy
Since Wheldon's death at the Las Vegas oval, much emphasis has been put into the elimination of "pack racing" through changes to the tires and downforce levels on high-banked ovals (particularly at Texas Motor Speedway, for its annual IndyCar event). Such racing has been seen on occasion since the Vegas race, most notably at the 2015 MAVTV 500 at Auto Club Speedway (which ended with contact entering the final lap that sent Ryan Briscoe, subbing for Hinchcliffe, airborne), and the 2017 Rainguard Water Sealers 600 at Texas, where "pack racing" again reappeared (the latter event also featured a NASCAR phenomenon known as "The Big One") and only a handful of drivers finished the race, although none were seriously injured. However, for the most part the league has avoided pack races in the years since the 2011 Finale.

Talk of a canopy or halo to protect the driver was accelerated by the fatal Formula One accident that killed Jules Bianchi in October 2014 and an incident where Justin Wilson was fatally struck in the head by debris at the August 2015 ABC Supply 500 at Pocono Raceway. In particular, following Wilson's death, Allmendinger stated that he would "never again" run open-wheel cars, adding "The only way I would do it is if they put in a closed cockpit over the car and tested it and they thought that was a good direction in safety then I might think about doing it again." As a result, several major open-wheel series have implemented cockpit protection systems, with Formula One, Formula Two, Formula Three and Formula E all introducing the halo in 2018, and IndyCar instituting the Aeroscreen in 2020.

The rear wheel pods introduced to IndyCar in 2012 intended to prevent cars from becoming airborne when hitting another in the rear proved to be ineffective as there were major crashes resulting from such contact, including Dario Franchitti's career-ending crash during the 2013 race in Houston, as well as the 2017 Indianapolis 500 involving Scott Dixon. In addition the pods were often ripped from cars from light contact, placing hazardous debris on the track. As a result, the rear pods were eliminated for 2018.

In March 2016, during the Kobalt 400 NASCAR weekend, Fox Sports reporter Jamie Little, who was on the ESPN broadcast and drove to University Medical Center as part of post-crash coverage, and Wheldon's close friend Brent Brush placed a memorial plaque at the site Wheldon's car impacted the catch fencing post.  For the 2022 NASCAR October weekend as Las Vegas, Nick Yeoman, an INDYCAR Radio broadcaster, worked the PRN broadcast in Turn 2 near near the Wheldon plaque.  Yeoman posted on Twitter, "Here’s to remembering legends and creating better memories on October 16th," while showing the Wheldon memorial and his broadcast position.  

INDYCAR returned to Las Vegas Motor Speedway in January 2022 during the Consumer Electronics Show, with the Indy Autonomous Challenge at the Consumer Electronics Show in Las Vegas, which was repeated in 2023.  The car is an Indy NXT chassis modified for the challenge.  The PoliMOVE team of Politecnico di Milano and the University of Alabama has won both events.   Speeds reached 180 MPH in the 2023 challenge at CES.

Classification

Qualifying

Notes:
 – Rice was moved to the back of the grid after receiving a penalty for running below the white line.
 – Wheldon agreed to start the race from thirty-fourth and last place on the grid as part of the organizers' five million dollar challenge.

Scoring when abandoned

Standings after the race

 Note: Only the Top 5 positions are included.

See also

References

External links

IZOD IndyCar World Championship
IZOD IndyCar World Championship
IZOD IndyCar World Championship
IZOD IndyCar World Championship
Motorsport in Las Vegas
IZOD IndyCar World Championship
IZOD IndyCar World Championship 2011
IZOD IndyCar World Championship